Joshua Pritchard Hughes (13 February 1847 – 8 April 1938) was Bishop of Llandaff from 1905 to 1931.

Hughes was born into an ecclesiastical family, the son of Joshua Hughes (Bishop of St Asaph 1870–1889). His older brother was the geologist Thomas McKenny Hughes. He was educated at Shrewsbury School and Balliol College, Oxford and ordained in 1871. He was a curate in Neath from 1872 to 1877, vicar of Newcastle, Bridgend from 1878 to 1884  and then Llantrisant from 1884 to 1905  before his ordination to the episcopate.

The Dahlia 'Bishop of Llandaff' was selected by him and named in his honour.

References

External links
 
 Portrait, circa 1910s

1847 births
1938 deaths
People educated at Shrewsbury School
Alumni of Balliol College, Oxford
Bishops of Llandaff
20th-century bishops of the Church in Wales